Harish in Iran may refer to:
 Harish, South Khorasan
 Harish, Zanjan